The Bulgarian Islamic Academy is a theological islamic instite in Bolgar, Tatarstan, Russia.

History 
In November 2015, the President of Tatarstan Rustam Minnikhanov signed a decree on the establishment of the Bulgarian Islamic Academy. It's stated the creation of a domestic Islamic theological school is the main purpose. The creation of the academy was supported by the President of the Russian Federation Vladimir Putin.

On May 21, 2016, on the day of the adoption of Islam by Volga Bulgaria, a solemn ceremony of laying a memorial stone in the foundation of the educational and residential complex of the academy took place. On May 20, 2017, the construction of educational and residential and 6 bedroom buildings for teachers and students was completed.

In July 2017, the  complex, consisting of a mosque, a madrasah and a residence, was attached to the academy.

On September 4, 2017, the opening of the institution took place.

Education 
Due to the acute shortage of highly qualified teachers with higher Islamic education, foreign theologians were invited to work at the Bulgarian Islamic Academy: from Jordan, Egypt, Morocco and Syria. At first, the teaching took place in Arabic.

Much attention is paid to the study of the Tatar and Old Tatar languages.

The academy trains masters and doctors of Islamic Sciences. From 2020 The academy also trains specialists in the "Theology".

In the 2021/2022 academic year, 22 teachers take part in the implementation of educational programs, 5 of them are foreign.

International cooperation 
The academy has cooperation agreements with a number of foreign educational institutions and scientific and public organizations.

References

External links 
  

Universities in Tatarstan
Buildings and structures in Tatarstan
Islamic universities and colleges
Religious schools in Russia